The Art Seidenbaum Award for First Fiction, established in 1991, is a category of the Los Angeles Times Book Prize awarded to authors' debut books of fiction. It is named for the Los Angeles Times' critic Art Seidenbaum who was also an author and editor. Works are eligible during the year of their first US publication in English, though they may be written originally in languages other than English.

Recipients

References  

English-language literary awards
20th-century literary awards
21st-century literary awards
International literary awards
Awards established in 1991
First book awards
Los Angeles Times